Byeongyeong Nam clan was one of the Korean clans. During Joseon period, the ship of Hendrick Hamel’s group had an accident and was adrift in Jeolla Province. After that, a member of Hendrick Hamel's group married a Korean woman, and his descendants are the Byeongyeong Nam clan.

See also 
 Korean clan names of foreign origin

References

External links 
 

Nam clans